Mick McKeon (c. 1923 – 15 July 1987) was an Irish boxer. He competed in the men's middleweight event at the 1948 Summer Olympics. At the 1948 Summer Olympics, he reached the bronze medal bout, but lost via a walkover to Ivano Fontana of Italy.

References

External links
 

1920s births
1987 deaths
Irish male boxers
Olympic boxers of Ireland
Boxers at the 1948 Summer Olympics
Place of birth missing
Middleweight boxers